The 2022 United States Senate election in North Dakota was held on November 8, 2022, to elect a member of the United States Senate to represent the state of North Dakota. Incumbent Republican John Hoeven was first elected in 2010 with 76% of the vote to succeed retiring Democratic–NPL incumbent Byron Dorgan, and won re-election in 2016 with 78.5% of the vote. He ran for a re-election to a third term in office against Democratic-NPL nominee Katrina Christiansen.

Hoeven won reelection to a third term in office with 56.4% of the vote, but his performance was far less impressive than in both of his prior races, and even substantially lower than what most polling had indicated. This underperformance was in part attributed to the candidacy of Rick Becker, an independent and former Republican, who took 18.5% of the vote. Additionally, Christiansen's 25% vote share was the highest of any Democratic–NPL candidate for the class 3 Senate seat since Dorgan's landslide 2004 win.

Republican primary

Candidates

Nominee 
John Hoeven, incumbent U.S. Senator

Eliminated in primary 
Riley Kuntz, oil worker

Withdrawn
Rick Becker, state representative (running as Independent)

Endorsements

Results

Democratic-NPL primary

Candidates

Nominee 
Katrina Christiansen, University of Jamestown engineering professor

Eliminated in primary 
Michael Steele, small business owner

Endorsements

Results

Independent

Candidates

Qualified 
Rick Becker, state representative

General election

Predictions

Endorsements

Results

See also 
 2022 United States Senate elections
 2022 North Dakota elections

References

External links 
Official campaign websites
 John Hoeven (R) for Senate
 Katrina Christiansen (D) for Senate

2022
North Dakota
United States Senate